Troy Pickard ( 1973 – 13 January 2022) was an Australian local government politician. He was the mayor of the City of Joondalup from 2006 to 2017, deputy mayor of the City of Stirling from 2001 to 2005, president of the Western Australian Local Government Association from 2010 to 2015, and president of the Australian Local Government Association from 2014 to 2016.

Local government career
Pickard started out in local government in 2001, elected to the coast ward of the City of Stirling. There, he was deputy mayor. He left the City of Stirling in 2005.

In 2006, Pickard was elected as the second mayor of the City of Joondalup, gaining 15% of the vote, and beating ten other candidates. This was three years after the previous Joondalup council had been sacked. Between December 2003 and his election May 2006, the City of Joondalup was controlled by state government appointed commissioners. He was re-elected in 2009, gaining 54% of the vote and beating two other candidates, and in 2013, gaining 57% of the vote and beating one other candidate. Although he initially said he would recontest the 2017 election, he eventually chose not to. He was succeeded as mayor by former state government minister Albert Jacob.

His achievements at the City of Joondalup include planning for the Ocean Reef Marina and overseeing high density development in the Joondalup central business district.

Pickard was a long-term member of the Liberal Party.

In April 2012, fellow Joondalup councillor Brian Corr accused Pickard of assault during a council meeting on 3 April. The police investigation was concluded in June 2012, with no charges laid.

In 2007, Pickard was elected deputy president of the Western Australian Local Government Association (WALGA). On 7 April 2010, Pickard was elected as the president of WALGA, after previous president Bill Mitchell resigned. On 12 November 2014, Pickard was appointed president of the Australian Local Government Association (ALGA). He stayed in his role at WALGA until 1 July 2015, wanting to stay until the end of the state government's local government mergers. In 2016, Pickard left his role as president of ALGA.

Outside local government
In June 2016, Pickard founded Franchise Fusion Group, which was the Western Australian master franchisee of the Bucking Bull roast meat restaurant chain. In late 2017, Pickard opened a nitro coffee shop named Primal Pantry in Brookfield Place. Primal Pantry was operated by a subsidiary of Franchise Fusion Group. By January 2020, Franchise Fusion Group and its subsidiaries were in liquidation, with over $1 million of creditor claims.

In January 2018, Pickard was charged with assault, with police alleging he threw a cup of coffee at his neighbour's face. In March 2019, he went on trial, and in April 2019, he was acquitted, with CCTV unable to show whether Pickard's neighbour had sprayed him with a hose in the moments before.

Death
Pickard died suddenly on 13 January 2022, at the age of 48.

References

1970s births
2022 deaths
City of Joondalup
Mayors of places in Western Australia
Liberal Party of Australia politicians
21st-century Australian politicians
People acquitted of assault
Western Australian local councillors
Deputy mayors of places in Australia